The Pyongyang International Film Festival is a biennial cultural exhibition held in Pyongyang, North Korea. Until 2002, the film festival was reserved to "non-aligned and other developing countries".

History
The event originated in 1987 as the Pyongyang Film Festival of the Non-aligned and Other Developing Countries(쁠럭불가담 및 기타 발전도상 나라들의 평양영화축전). The maiden event, held from September 1 through September 10, showed short films, features, and documentaries that were judged for competitive awards.

The film festival returned in 1990 and would be regularly held every other year. Recurrent subject matter included domestic cinema that commonly praised the high leadership such as a film shown at the 1992 film festival, verbosely translated, Glory of Our People in Holding the Great Leader in High Esteem, and foreign films about revolutionary resistance.

In 2000, officials widened the acceptable breadth of film watching by screening Japanese films for the first time when Yoji Yamada arrived to present six of his films. 2002 saw further relaxation of rules and since then the festival has been open to more than just "non-aligned and other developing countries".

The ninth festival, held in 2004, moderated cultural restrictions further with the screening of a dubbed and censored version of the British comedy Bend It Like Beckham and U.S.-produced South African drama Cry, The Beloved Country. Bend it like Beckham won the music prize and later it became the first Western-made film shown on television in North Korea.

In 2006, the Swedish horror comedy Frostbiten was shown at the festival, the first foreign horror film to ever be shown in North Korea.

The Schoolgirl's Diary, which premiered at the 2006 festival, in 2007 became the first North Korean film in several decades to be picked up for international distribution, when it was purchased by French company Pretty Pictures. It was released in France in late 2007.

Organization

The festival was held in the autumn every two years until 2018; after that, the festival has become yearly, with the 17th edition organized in September 2019. It has an international jury and both competitive and non-competitive submissions. In that sense, it is "structured ... very much like any other international film festival".

Since 2000, the festival has been dominated by films from Western Europe. Many of the films are censored and often have themes emphasising family values, loyalty and the temptations of money. In 2008, 110 films were shown from a total of 46 countries. South Korean films are not shown because of the current political climate. Films critical of North Korean from anywhere in the world are not allowed and neither are sexually explicit films. Anything else goes, and the organizers try to get as many films and visitors to attend. Diplomatic connections or the personal initiative of filmmakers is what often results in a film being admitted. The result is often "an odd mix" of films that are not united by one genre. In recent years, the festival has enjoyed recent popularity abroad, mainly due to the success of South Korean cinema prompting foreign film enthusiasts' curiosity about the North. Consequentially, film submissions have increased and the selection of films has improved in quality.

The festival is one of the few North Korean functions that actively seeks connection with the outside world. Johannes Schönherr, author of North Korean Cinema: A History and a festival delegate in 2000, said "The Pyongyang International Film Festival is a big propaganda event and foreigners who attend the event become extras in the big propaganda show."

Most Japanese films and all American, Taiwanese and South Korean films are banned in North Korea. Taiwanese and South Korean films are banned because of the anti-communist nature of their countries.

Major Award Winners
{| class="wikitable sortable"style="border-collapse:collapse;margin:0auto;" 
|-
! colspan=2 | Year !! Best Film Grand Prix(홰불금상, golden torch award) !! Best Director !! Best Actor !! Best Actress
|-
| 1987 || 1st || A Broad Bellflower|||| Jamshid Mashayekhifor The Grandfather|| O Mi-ranfor A Broad Bellflower
|-
| 1990 || 2nd || Little Bird of Happiness|||| Omar Shariffor The Puppeteer(الاراجوز )|| O Mi-ranfor Traces of Life (생의 흔적)
|-
| 1992 || 3rd || Nation and Destiny (Parts 1 & 2)|||| Alireza Khamsehfor Apartment No.13|| Shabana Azmifor Libaas
|-
| 1994 || 4th || The Forest of Reed(Cỏ Lau) (by Nsut Vương Đức) |||| Abolfazl Poorarab(ابوالفضل پورعرب)for The Bride(عروس)|| Kim Kyong-aefor The Kind-Hearted Girl(고마운 처녀)
|-
| 1996 || 5th || Red Cherry|||||| Guo Keyu(郭柯宇)for Red Cherry
|-
| 1998 || 6th || Myself in the Distant Future|||| Khosrow Shakibaifor Long Lost Sisters|| Kim Hye-gyongfor Myself in the Distant Future
|-
| 2000 || 7th || The Lost Love(عشق گمشده)|||| Bassam Kousafor The Extras|| Jang Son-huifor The Earth of Love(사랑의 대지)
|-
| 2002 || 8th|| The Star|||| Kim Cholfor Souls Protest|| Hedieh Tehranifor Party
|-
| 2004 || 9th|| Gone Is the One Who Held me dearest in the world(世界上最疼我的那个人走了)|||| Wang Zhiwenfor On the Other Side of the Bridge(Am anderen Ende der Brücke)||
|-
| 2006 || 10th|| Before the Fall|| Stéphane Brizéfor Not Here to Be Loved|| Jan Decleirfor Off Screen|| Sara Caprettifor Sternenberg
|-
| 2008 || 11th|| Assembly|| Feng Xiaogangfor Assembly|| Saša Petrovićfor It's Hard to Be Nice|| Bita Farrahifor Mainline
|-
| 2010 || 12th|| Walking to School(走路上學)|| Khosro Masumi(خسرو معصومی)for Wind Blows in the Meadow(باد در علفزار می‌پیچد)|| Fyodor Dobronravovfor A Man at Home(Мужчина в доме)|| Martina Gedeckfor Bets and Wedding Dresses
|-
| 2012 || 13th|| Lessons of a Dream||3 Directorsfor Comrade Kim Goes Flying|| Daniel Brühlfor Lessons of a Dream|| Polina Kutepovafor Wind House
|-
| 2014 || 14th|| My Beautiful Country|| Shi Wei(石伟)for The Ferry|| Zhou Guangda (周光大)for The Ferry (我的渡口)|| Svetlana Khodchenkovafor Vasilisa
|-
| 2016 || 15th|| The Story of Our Home (우리집 이야기)|| Oleg Asadulinfor Green Carriage|| Andrey Merzlikinfor Green Carriage|| Paek Sol-mifor The Story of Our Home
|-
| 2018 || 16th|| The Woman Behind the Man|| Klim Shipenkofor Salyut|| Li Xuejianfor The Woman Behind the Man (老阿姨, also translated as Old aunt) || He Saifeifor Goddesses in the Flames of War|}

 See also 

 International Cinema Hall
 Cinema of North Korea

References

 Gluckman, Ron (September 27, 2004). "Kim Puts On a Festival". Newsweek, p. 45.
 "To Pyongyang with love". (October 16, 2004). The Economist''.

Works cited

External links

 
 Pyongyang International Film Festival  at Korfilm
 Now playing, in Pyongyang – an American reporter's commentary
 "9th Pyongyang Film Festival Closes" at KCNA
 "Korean Pyongyang Film Festival opens" at KCNA

Film festivals in North Korea
Culture in Pyongyang
Recurring events established in 1987
1987 establishments in North Korea
Biennial events
Film festivals established in 1987
Festivals in North Korea